Front of Prudence and Development of Islamic Iran is the alliance of five Iranian minor political groups that issued electoral list for the 2016 legislative elections.

The group which was established by Rouhani 2013 presidential campaigners, and support the Government of Hassan Rouhani, but did not ally with the List of Hope –the coalition including the president's party, Moderation and Development Party– in the 2016 elections. They initially intended to ally with the Reformists Front.

Member groups 
Groups involving this front include:
Islamic Revolution Devotees Party
Solidarity of Graduates Party
Association for Graduates of Azarbaijan
Development of Islamic Iran Party
Islamic Iran National Unity Party

2016 election list

Tehran, Rey, Shemiranat and Eslamshahr
The group had 14 exclusive candidates, all losing the election, and the rest of 16 candidates in the list was derived from Hope and People's Voice lists.
Their top voted exclusive candidate was actor Mahmoud Azizi, who was placed 77th receiving only 19,133 votes out of 3,440,968.

Exclusive candidates winning seats 
According to the front's spokesperson, 79 of the candidates winning a seat in the first round were supported by the group, however most of them were included in the election's three major lists List of Hope, Principlists Grand Coalition and People's Voice. 11 candidates won seats while being supported by the group and not listed by any of the big three lists. Among them, four were incumbent and two were former members of the parliament.

References

External links 
 Official Website

Political party alliances in Iran
Electoral lists for Iranian legislative election, 2016